Collet Barker (31 December 1784 – 30 April 1831) was a British military officer and explorer. He explored areas of South Australia, Western Australia and Cobourg Peninsula, Northern Territory.

History

Barker was born in Hackney, England, and lived in Newbury as a child. He joined the British Army on 23 January 1806, as an ensign by purchase in the 39th Regiment of Foot; he became a lieutenant in 1809 and a captain in 1825. Barker was a veteran of the Peninsular Wars, serving in Sicily, Portugal, Spain, and France. He also served in Canada and Ireland before embarking with his regiment, the 39th Regiment of Foot 1st Battalion, on the prison hulk Phoenix for Australia; he arrived in Sydney on 18 July 1828.

Northern Territory
On 13 September 1828 he arrived as the new commandant of Fort Wellington, the settlement at Raffles Bay in the Northern Territory.

When Barker arrived to take up command at Fort Wellington, relations between the Aboriginal people and the settlers under the previous command of Captain Henry Smyth had deteriorated to the point of mutual fear and hostility. In his first dispatch to Governor Darling, Barker reported, "Nothing has been seen of the Natives for a considerable time; they appear to have deserted the immediate neighbourhood". A series of thefts and spearings by the Aborigines led to the former commandant offering a reward of five pounds for "any native who could be brought in, hoping that, by keeping such individual at the settlement, it might have the effect of preventing any further hostility".

The result of this, to further quote Darling, was a "very gross outrage". A six-year-old Aboriginal girl named Riveral was captured during a raid on an encampment by six men from the settlement, including armed convicts. Private Charles Miller, in evidence sworn to an enquiry, stated the following.

It was with this background that Collet Barker began his command, on 13 September 1828. Barker first made contact with the local Aboriginal people on 25 November 1828, when Costello the stockman reported that he had made contact. Barker and Davis the surgeon were taken to the place of contact, where they met ten men, whom they presented with handkerchiefs, a pair of scissors, and some bread. The group invited Barker to accompany them, which Barker declined to do, though he tried to convey that he would be pleased to do so another time. Barker recorded his second contact with the local inhabitants in his journal, dated 2 December 1828, as follows. 

It was soon after this that the aborigines approached the settlement and were induced to enter by Barker's sending Norrie, their Malay interpreter's daughter, to take Wellington's hand and lead him into the fort. Over the following months, Barker had restored relations to the point where he was able to go off alone with the locals on trips for days at a time with complete safety.

One of the reasons for the establishment of the settlement was to try to establish commercial contacts with the Malay or Macassan fishers who regularly sailed their proas to the Northern shores of Australia in search of the trepang, or sea-slugs, which they traded with the Chinese. Over the course of the year over 1000 seafarers visited the shores of Raffles Bay and showed keen interest in establishing trade with Barker's outpost. Barker in his journals, records many Aboriginal names, words and aspects of Aboriginal culture gleaned through the regular contact that was developed with the local inhabitants. There continued to be sources of friction between the two cultures, especially the theft of the settlement's canoes. Barker solved this by negotiating to lend the canoes and found that by the July, they were being returned with fish and tortoise shell in them as thanks.

Orders to abandon the settlement had been received before Barker's dispatches reporting the success of his contacts with the Macassan fishers and the improvements in their relations with the Aboriginal inhabitants could affect the outcome of Governor Darling's decision. Barker then moved on to become commandant of the British settlement at King George Sound, stopping off at the new settlement of Swan River, Perth, on the way.

Western Australia
The following year Barker was commander at King George Sound in Western Australia. Barker was an excellent administrator and proved to be a humane friend to the Indigenous people at both commands. He recorded Aboriginal place names, people, traditions and beliefs which otherwise might have been lost.

South Australia
In 1831, on the recommendation of Charles Sturt, who had visited the shoaled mouth of the Murray River the previous year, Barker was sent to explore the east coast of Gulf St Vincent in South Australia to see if another channel from the Murray entered the sea there.

On 13 April 1831, Barker and his party arrived at Cape Jervis on the Isabella. He examined the coast and found that there was no channel. Barker encountered the Onkaparinga River on 15 April. He then explored the ranges inland, north of the present site of Adelaide, and climbed Mount Lofty where he sighted the Port River inlet, Barker Inlet and the future Port Adelaide, his most important sighting. He then moored Isabella near present Yankalilla Bay and went overland to explore the area around Lake Alexandrina and Encounter Bay.

Death
On 29 April 1831, they reached the Murray Mouth. Barker swam across the narrow channel the next morning, went over a sandhill, and was never seen again. A few days later the party learned that Barker had been killed by the local Indigenous people who may have taken him for a whaler or sealer, many of whom had abducted Indigenous women. The men responsible had been identified, but no retaliation or punitive action against those believed responsible was undertaken, which one commentator believed emboldened those people to commit further attacks on Europeans, notably the Maria survivors.

Had he lived, Barker was to have been sent by Governor Darling to New Zealand's North Island as first resident because of the feared Māori unrest; his role was to conciliate.

Recognition
Mount Barker was named for him by Captain Sturt, who erroneously thought it was Mount Lofty, and the eponymous town is named for the mountain. The town of Mount Barker, Western Australia and the electoral division of Division of Barker in south-eastern South Australia are also named for him.

Personal life
Barker never married. His nearest relations were Collet Dobson Collet, nephew; Clara Collet, great niece; Edward Dobson, New Zealand engineer, nephew; and great nephews, Sir Arthur Dudley Dobson, New Zealand survey engineer, and George Dobson, New Zealand surveyor, who was murdered in 1866 by the Burgess gang.

See also
 List of solved missing person cases

Notes

References
Historical Records of Australia, Series I, Volume XVI: 237–241, 262–263, 486–487.
Historical Records of Australia, Series III, Volume VI: see Index listing for "Barker, Collet".
Bach, J. (1966), "Barker, Collet (1784–1831)", Australian Dictionary of Biography, Volume 1, Melbourne University Press, p. 57.
Collet Barker, journal, 13 Sep 1828–29 Aug 1829 (State Archives and Records Authority of New South Wales).
Mulvaney, John & Green, Neville (1992), Commandant of Solitude: The Journals of Captain Collet Barker, 1828–1831 (Miegunyah Press).
Price, A. G. (1924–1925), "The Work of Captain Collet Barker in South Australia", Proceedings of the Royal Geographical Society of Australasia: South Australian Branch, vol 26, pp 52–66.

External links
 Collet Barker  —Desert Star
 Newspaper articles mentioning "Collet Barker"  —Trove
 The death of Captain Barker  —Australian National Maritime Museum
 Pre-Colonial Contact   —Extract from Journey in Time by George Chaloupka
 European discovery of the River Murray system: Collet Barker’s exploration in Gulf St Vincent  —Government of South Australia

1784 births
1830s missing person cases
1831 deaths
British Army personnel of the Napoleonic Wars
British people in colonial Australia
Explorers of Australia
Explorers of South Australia
Male murder victims
Missing person cases in Australia
People from Hackney Central
People murdered in Australia